Hasegawa Kyūzō (1568 – July 13, 1593) was the son of Hasegawa Tōhaku, and a painter of the Hasegawa school in the Azuchi–Momoyama period Japan. 

Kyūzō was born as the first son between Tōhaku and his first wife Myōjō (died 1579). 

It is generally surmised that Kyūzō painted on the byōbu (wind screens) for Toyotomi Hideyoshi or other high-ranking Toyotomi supporter. Four of his works remain:

 Asahina Kusa Zuri Hiki Zu , Kiyomizu-dera, 1592, designated an Important Cultural Property
 Sakura Zu  (Cherry Tree), Chishaku-in (Shōun-ji), circa 1592, a part of Sakura Kaede Zu designated as a National Treasure of Japan
 Ohara Gōkō-zu Byōbu  (Emperor's Visit to Ohara), Tokyo National Museum
 Gion E-zu  (Gion Festival), Ishikawa Prefectural Museum of Art

Tōhaku intended Kyūzō to be his heir, if it were not for his early death in his mid-20s. 
Kyūzō was highly acclaimed by Kanō Einō in Honchō Gashi compiled in 1679 as that the "elegance of his work surpasses his father's, unmatched by none other in the Hasegawa school."

Notes

References

1568 births
1593 deaths
Japanese painters